Humanicide is the ninth studio album by the American thrash metal band Death Angel, released on May 31, 2019. Like their previous three studio albums, Humanicide was produced by Jason Suecof, while its release marks the first time the band had recorded more than three albums with the same lineup.

In November 2019, the title track was nominated for the Grammy Award for "Best Metal Performance", making it Death Angel's first ever Grammy nomination.

In October 2020, Death Angel released an acoustic version of "Revelation Song" on their EP Under Pressure.

Track listing

Personnel

Death Angel 
 Mark Osegueda – lead vocals
 Rob Cavestany – lead guitar, backing vocals
 Ted Aguilar – rhythm guitar
 Damien Sisson – bass
 Will Carroll – drums
 Alexi Laiho – guest guitar solo on track "Ghost of Me"

Production 
 Jason Suecof – production
 Ted Jensen – mastering at Sterling Sound Nashville

Charts

References 

2019 albums
Death Angel albums
Nuclear Blast albums
Albums produced by Jason Suecof